Lycus or Lykos was the name of a river in ancient Phrygia. It is tributary of the Maeander and joins it a few kilometres south of Tripolis. It had its sources in the eastern parts of Mount Cadmus (Strabo xii. p. 578), not far from those of the Meander itself, and it flowed westerly towards Colossae. Near there, it disappeared in a chasm of the earth. After a distance of five stadia, however, its waters reappeared. After flowing by Laodicea ad Lycum, it discharged itself into the Maeander. (Herod. vii. 30; Plin. v. 29; Ptol. v. 2. § 8; Hamilton, Researches, vol. i. p. 508, &c., and Journal of the Royal Geogr. Soc. vii. p. 60.)

References
 

Geography of Phrygia
History of Turkey
History of Denizli Province
Rivers of Turkey